Rastko Ćirić (born 24 May 1955) is a Serbian multimedia artist and educator. His fields of interest are graphics, illustration, logo design, ex-libris, comics, animation and music. He has won more than 70 local and international awards. He is a professor at the Faculty of Applied Arts in Belgrade.

Biography 
He was born into an artistic family. His parents, father Miloš and mother Ida, met at the Academy of Applied Arts in Belgrade. Rastko graduated in 1979, and finished his postgraduate studies in 1982 from the same school, now Faculty of Applied Arts. He is now a professor at the same school and Vice-Rector of the University of Arts in Belgrade.

He achieved voluminous opus in all the graphic fields, in film and in music. He authored 14 animated films. He has 44 individual exhibitions (Belgrade; Novi Sad; Vranje; Ljubljana and Kopar, Slovenia; Annecy and Orléans, France; Legnica, Poland; Hiroshima, Japan; Seoul, Korea; Polleur, Belgium). He was collaborator–illustrator of the New York Times Book Review.

He has been employed at the Faculty of Applied Arts since 1991. Since 2004, he has been a full-time professor of Illustration and Animation at the Applied Graphics department at the FAA, and leader of the Digital Arts Program at the interdisciplinary DA studies of the University of Arts in Belgrade. He is the founder and editor of the book edition and magazine “Signum” FAA (2006).

He is the author of the internationally recognised music project The Rubber Soul Project, inspired by The Beatles. A feature documentary by the same name (2004) directed by Dinko Tucaković, was dedicated to this project. A CD and DVD were published in 2006 in the USA. His new album The Rubber Soul Project 2, with Igor Kordey as producer was recorded in 2013 and released in 2015.

Rastko Ćirić is a member of ULUPUDS, ASIFA, Belgrade Ex-libris Circle, Art Directors Club Serbia and Association of Comics Artists of Serbia.

He is the founder and Art Director of the Festival of European Student Animation FESA (2012).

He lives in Belgrade.

Bibliography 
 Take Your Drawings for a Walk – Small School of Animation (Prošetajte svoje crteže – Mala škola animacije, 1986)
 Ogres and Bogies (Ale i Bauci), with Aleksandar Palavestra (1989, 2002, 2013)
 Handy Zoo (Svojeručni zoo, 1990)
 Common Life Anatomy (Anatomija svakodnevnog života, 1994, 1998)
 Manual for Sophisticated Bondaging (Priručnik za dovitljivo sputavanje, 1994, 1998)
 Ogres and Boogies Self-Defence Manual (Priručnik za odbranu i zaštitu od ala i bauka, 1994, 1998)
 Telephone Jokes (Telefonski vicevi, 1994, 1998)
 First, Second and Third Story About Farty (Prva, druga i treća priča o Prtku, 1992, 1994, 2000)
 Invisible and Poorly Visible Animal Species (Nevidljive i slabo vidljive životinjske vrste, 1998)
 Fairy Chess (Vilinski šah, 1998)
 Ping-Pong Balls Cracker (Krckalica za ping-pong loptice, 1999)
 Targetophilia (Meta-fore, 1999)
 Centaur Letters (Slova-kentauri, 2000)
 Pangrams (Pangrami, 2000)
 Home-Bred Metamorph Cultivating Manual (Priručnik za gajenje domaćeg metamorfa, 2002)
 Ten Lecturers by Rastko Ćirić (Deset poučnika Rastka Ćirića, 2003)
 What is Rebus? (Šta je rebus?, 2003)
 Miscellenia (Svaštara, 2005)
 Collection of Texts about Ex-Libris (Zbornik o ekslibrisu, 2007)
 Bash Tchelik (2010)
 Studio Bikić (2013) with M. Jelić and M. Novaković
 Collection of texts about FAA 1 (Zbornik FPU 1, 2013)

Animated films 
 The Circus Departs (1982, Neoplanta Film), 6:00 Music: Đorđe Balašević
 Stop (1983, Dunav Film/FDU) 1:20
 It’s not Whether You Win or Lose (1984, Dunav Film) 1:30, Olympiad of Animation, Los Angeles, 1984
 Tango Ragtime (1985, Dunav Film) 8:15 Music: Rastko Ćirić and Laza Ristovski
 The Tower of Bababel (1988, Zagreb Film) 4:30 Music: Laza Ristovski
 Ogres and Bogies (1989, Avala Film) 9:00 Music: Laza Ristovski
 Farty (1993, Dunav Film/Aura) 2:30 Music: Dragan Ilić
 Light in A-Major (1995, Avala Film) 4:30 Music: Laza Ristovski
 Invisible and Poorly Visible Animal Species (1998, Dunav Film) 4:35 Music: Dragan Ilić
 Magician (1999, Dunav Film) 1:00 text: Dušan Radović, music: Miodrag Ilić Beli, Dragan Ilić. Part of the series “Esteemed Children”
 Wanted (2001, Dunav Film) 1:00 text: Dušan Radović, music: Dragan Ilić. Part of the series “Esteemed Children”
 All Together on The Wireless Machine (2004, Soul Flower) 3:00 text Goran Skrobonja, music: Rastko Ćirić. Opening part of the feature documentary The Rubber Soul Project, directed by Dinko Tucaković.
 Metamorph (2005, Rastko Ćirić & BS Group) 10:30 English version, narrated by Timothy John Byford
 Metamorph (2005, Rastko Ćirić & BS Group) 10:30 Serbian version, narrated by Branislav Milićević
 Fantasmagorie 2008 (2008, Rastko Ćirić & Metamorf) 8:30 Music: Nebojša Ignjatović
 Fantasmagorie 2008, stereoscopic version (2008, Rastko Ćirić & Metamorf) 8:30 Music: Nebojša Ignjatović

Music 
 Tango Ragtime, from the animated film of the same name (performed by Laza Ristovski) 1985.
 Rubber Soul Project, 15 compositions inspired by the Beatles music, texts by Goran Skrobonja, producers N. Ignjatović and M. Cvetković, 1996.
 The Reservation Blues, antiwar song, with the Reservate Band (later Target project), producer Đorđe Petrović, April 1999.
 City And Memory, music for the feature documentary film by Gabriela Hohleitner, Austria, 2000.
 Rubber Soul Project 2, 17 compositions inspired by the Beatles music, texts by Goran Skrobonja, producer Igor Kordey, 2013.

Awards and recognitions 
Won more than 70 awards and recognitions for animation, graphics and social work.

More import awards for animation: Munich 1982, Zagreb 1988, Ottawa 1988, Belgrade 1989, Titograd, 1989, Belgrade 1989, Zlatibor 1993, Novi Sad 1993, Belgrade 1998, Kiev, Ukraine 1998, Drama, Greece 1998, Belgrade 1999, Grand-prix Čačak 1999, Grand-prix Belgrade 2006, Moscow 2006, Hiroshima 2006, Belgrade 2008, Ljubljana 2008, Belgrade 2009, Lipecki, Russia 2009.

Winner of the plaque „Nikola Mitrović Kokan“ for the contribution to the Serbian comic strip, in 2003.

References

External links 

  Personal website
  The Rubber Soul Project, official website
 
 Discography at Discogs
 Personal Youtube video channel 
 (Serbian) Interview, VFX Serbia, 2014. 
 (Serbian) Interview - Rastko Ćirić – illustrator, animator and musician: Trag o sebi

1955 births
Living people
Artists from Belgrade
Film people from Belgrade
Musicians from Belgrade
Serbian cartoonists
Serbian animators
Serbian comics artists
Serbian comics writers
Serbian illustrators
Serbian satirists
Serbian graphic designers
Serbian typographers and type designers
Serbian anti-war activists
Serbian directors
Serbian educators
Serbian rock guitarists
Serbian composers
Serbian film score composers
Serbian rock singers
Serbian singer-songwriters
University of Arts in Belgrade alumni
Rock pianists
Male guitarists
Male pianists
Male film score composers
21st-century pianists
21st-century Serbian male singers